Till We Have Built Jerusalem may refer to:
 The 38th episode of The 4400
 A verse from "And did those feet in ancient time", William Blake poem also known as the hymn "Jerusalem"
 A book from Adina Hoffman, published in 2016